Holíč (until 1946 "Holič") is a town in western Slovakia.

History
The oldest archaeological findings in the area date from the Neolithic, and there are findings from the Bronze Age, Iron Age and the Roman time. The town was first mentioned in 1205 as Wywar, meaning "New Castle". The Árpád dynasty built a stone castle after the Mongol invasion in 1241. From the 13th century until 1296, Holíč was the seat of a border comitatus. Among the owners of the town were Matthias Csák and Stibor of Stiborice. In the 15th century the town's development was slowed by the Hussite raids. In 1736 the town was bought by Franz I, Holy Roman Emperor, husband of Maria Theresa and manufactures were built, leading to the town's growth. Maria Theresa also rebuilt the Holíč Castle from a fortress into a summer château of the Habsburgs. Holíč's once thriving Jewish community
was completely decimated by the Holocaust.

Holíč also gives its name to a type of tin-glazed earthenware faience that was manufactured in the area. The Holitsch factory (Slovakia) was founded in 1743 by Francis of Lorainne, consort of Empress Maria Teresia. The factory concentrated on the production of richly adorned sets intended to emulate the wares used by the aristocracy in the large western European centers. The factory, which served as a revitalizing force against the decline of local potters in the 18th century, brought together experts from different countries in a co-operative effort to produce wares from which later central European factories derived their inspiration. Responding to an eager market and following patterns established at the Strasbourg factory, the Holitsch factory produced remarkably life-like pieces imitating fruits and vegetables. These fine examples of modeling were further distinguished by the brightness of the colors used in their decorations. The potters also created sculpture vessels of human or animal shapes that were intended for a practical as well as decorative use such as salt dishes, parrot bottles, and lidded containers.

In August 1942, President Jozef Tiso gave an infamous speech in the town in which he defended the deportation of Jews from Slovakia, because they were "parasites".

Geography

Sights
Holíč Castle, now a baroque château
Gothic church from 1387
Capuchin church from 1755
Tolerantion church from 1787
Burgher house, originally in Baroque, now in Art Nouveau style
Complex of manufacture buildings
Water and wind mills
Loretan and Florian chapels

In the neighbouring village of Kopčany, the 9th century St. Margaret's Church from the time of Great Moravia, is located.

Demographics
According to the 2001 census, the town had 11,416 inhabitants. 93.82% of inhabitants were Slovaks, 3.68% Czechs, 0.99% Roma and 0.48% Ukrainians. The religious make-up was 66.36% Roman Catholics, 23.20% people with no religious affiliation and 6.04% Lutherans.

Twin towns — sister cities

Holíč is twinned with:
 Hodonín, Czech Republic
 Hollabrunn, Austria
 Hlozany, Serbia
 Maloyaroslavets, Russia

See also
 List of municipalities and towns in Slovakia
 Holíč Castle

References

Genealogical resources

The records for genealogical research are available at the state archive "Statny Archiv in Bratislava, Slovakia"

 Roman Catholic church records (births/marriages/deaths): 1678–1922 (parish A)
 Lutheran church records (births/marriages/deaths): 1786–1895 (parish A)

External links

 Town website
Surnames of living people in Holic

Cities and towns in Slovakia